The following is the list of squads for each of the twelve teams competing in the 2022 FIBA Women's Basketball World Cup, to be held in Australia between 22 September and 1 October 2022. Each team selected a squad of 12 players for the tournament.

Group A

Belgium
An eleven-player roster was announced on 4 September 2022, with the last spot being filled on 19 September.

Bosnia and Herzegovina
The roster was announced on 21 September 2022.

China

Puerto Rico
The roster was announced on 21 September 2022.

South Korea
The roster was announced on 24 August 2022.

United States
The roster was announced on 19 September 2022.

Group B

Australia
The roster was announced on 10 August 2022.

Canada
The roster was announced on 19 September 2022.

France
The roster was announced on 18 September 2022.

Japan
The roster was announced on 8 September 2022.

Mali

Serbia
The roster was announced on 21 September 2022.

References

Squads
2022